Wolf-Udo Ettel (26 February 1921 – 17 July 1943) was a German World War II Luftwaffe flying ace and a posthumous recipient of the Knight's Cross of the Iron Cross with Oak Leaves, the highest award in the military and paramilitary forces of Nazi Germany during World War II. Ettel is listed with 124 aerial victories—that is, 124 aerial combat encounters resulting in the destruction of the enemy aircraft—claimed in over 250 missions. He was killed in action by anti-aircraft artillery on 17 July 1943 over Fascist Italy.

Early life and schooling
Ettel was born on 26 February 1921 in Hamburg in the Weimar Republic. He was the son of a representative of the Junkers aircraft manufacture. Due to his father's work, the family lived in Teheran and in Colombia where he attended the German school. Following his parents' divorce and return to Germany in 1934, he and his two younger brothers attended the Potsdam National Political Institutes of Education (Nationalpolitische Erziehungsanstalt—Napola) which was a secondary boarding school founded under the recently established Nazi state. The goal of the Napola schools was to raise a new generation for the political, military and administrative leadership of Nazi Germany.

World War II
World War II in Europe began on Friday 1 September 1939 when German forces invaded Poland. On 15 November 1939, Ettel volunteered for military service in the Luftwaffe. Following various training courses, he attended blind flying school in January 1941 and passed his A/B pilot license at Prenzlau. He then attended a Jagdfliegerschule (fighter pilot training school) based in Paris, France. In September 1941, he was posted to a Ergänzungs-Jagdgruppe (supplementary fighter group), a fighter pilot training unit based in Denmark.

On 10 April 1942, Leutnant Ettel was posted to 4. Staffel (squadron) of Jagdgeschwader 3 "Udet" (JG 3—3rd Fighter Wing), a II. Gruppe (2nd group) squadron. At the time, II. Gruppe had been placed under the overall command of Jagdgeschwader 53 (JG 53—53rd Fighter Wing) and was based at San Pietro Clarenza, Sicily, flying combat missions during the Siege of Malta.

Eastern Front
On 5 May 1942, Adolf Hitler issued his directive No. 41 which summarized his orders for the summer campaign in the Soviet Union and resulted in Case Blue, the Wehrmacht plan for the 1942 strategic summer offensive in southern Russia. In preparation for this campaign, II. Gruppe was moved to the Eastern Front, arriving in Pilsen from Sicily on 27 April. The Gruppe was then placed under the command of Hauptmann Kurt Brändle and refit for the summer campaign. After three weeks of rest, II. Gruppe, as part of the VIII. Fliegerkorps, was placed on the left wing of Army Group South and ordered to relocate to an airfield at Chuguyev, first elements arriving on 19 May. On 24 June, II. That day, Ettel claimed his first two victories when he shot down two Ilyushin Il-2 "Shturmovik" ground-attack aircraft.

He bailed out of his damaged Messerschmitt Bf 109 F-4 "White 1" (Werknummer 8383—factory number) behind Soviet lines, swam across the Don River and returned to his unit four days later. On 24 July 1942, he received the Iron Cross 2nd Class and the Iron Cross 1st Class on 2 August. Ettel claimed his 20 aerial victory on 9 August, his 30th on 7 October, and was awarded the Front Flying Clasp of the Luftwaffe for Fighter Pilots on 23 October. Three further claims were filed on 31 October, his last victories in 1942, leading to the presentation of the German Cross in Gold in December 1942.

Following the German loss in the Battle of Stalingrad, 4. Staffel was relocated to the Kuban bridgehead, and during the months of intensive operations, Ettel claimed 28 Soviet aircraft shot down in March and 36 more in April, including five shot down on 11 April, an "ace-in-a-day" achievement. On 28 April 1943, Ettel claimed his 100th aerial victory. He was the 38th Luftwaffe pilot to achieve the century mark. In early May, II. Gruppe was moved to Kharkiv, from where they operated over the combat area east of Belgorod, operating in this area from 2 to 6 May. On 6 May, the Gruppe claimed twelve aerial victories, including four by Ettel, taking his total to 104.

On 11 May, Ettel claimed his 120th victory, his last on the Eastern Front, but was shot down by anti-aircraft fire, resulting in a forced landing of his Bf 109 G-4 (Werknummer 19 453) between the front lines, west of Anastassiewskaja. During his return to German held territory, Ettel came under heavy rifle fire from Soviet infantry but escaped unharmed. That same night Ettel led a Wehrmacht patrol to his damaged aircraft to salvage important equipment. Ettel was awarded the Knight's Cross of the Iron Cross on 1 June. The presentation was made by General der Jagdflieger Adolf Galland while Ettel was on vacation in Berlin.

Mediterranean Theatre and death
Promoted to Oberleutnant (first lieutenant), Ettel was appointed Staffelkapitän (squadron leader) of the newly created 8. Staffel of Jagdgeschwader 27 (JG 27—27th Fighter Wing), a squadron of III. Gruppe JG 27, at the time based in Tanagra, Greece. While based at Tanagra, III. Gruppe was reequipped with a full contingent of the Bf 109 G-4 and G-6 series. In June, the Gruppe familiarized themselves with the new aircraft, flying training missions. At the end of June, III. Gruppe was moved to an airfield at Argos in Peloponnese. There, the unit was tasked with flying combat air patrol mission over the Aegean Sea. The Allied invasion of Sicily resulted in the relocation of III. Gruppe to Brindisi in southern Italy on 14 July 1943.

III. Gruppe flew its first missions in support of the German ground forces southeast of Catania, Sicily on 15 July. Because of the distance to the target area, the Bf 109s had to be equipped with drop tanks. The flight engaged in aerial combat north of Mount Etna where Ettel claimed his first aerial victory in the Mediterranean Theatre over a Royal Air Force (RAF) Supermarine Spitfire fighter aircraft. The next day, he claimed another Spitfire shot down. At around noon that day, he claimed two United States Army Air Forces (USAAF) B-24 Liberator bombers shot down.

On 17 July 1943, III. Gruppe was again tasked with flying ground support missions against British forces in the vicinity of Catania. In the vicinity of Lentini, the Gruppe lost five of ten dispatched fighters to anti-aircraft fire, among them Ettel who was shot down and killed in action. His Bf 109 G-6 (Werknummer 18 402) crashed northeast of Lago di Lentini. Ettel was posthumously awarded the Knight's Cross of the Iron Cross with Oak Leaves on 31 August 1943, the 289th officer or soldier of the Wehrmacht so honored. He was buried at the German cemetery at Motta Sant'Anastasia in an unmarked grave.

Summary of career

Aerial victory claims
According to US historian David T. Zabecki, Ettel was credited with 124 aerial victories. Obermaier also lists Ettel with 124 victories claimed in over 250 missions. Of his 120 claims on the Eastern Front, 21 were Il-2 Sturmovik ground-attack aircraft. He claimed four victories over Sicily, which included two USAAF four-engine bombers.

Mathews and Foreman, authors of Luftwaffe Aces — Biographies and Victory Claims, researched the German Federal Archives and found records for 121 aerial victory claims, plus three further unconfirmed claims. This figure of confirmed claims includes 118 aerial victories on the Eastern Front and three on the Western Front, including two four-engined bomber.

Victory claims were logged to a map-reference (PQ = Planquadrat), for example "PQ 29323". These sectors were then subdivided into 36 smaller units to give a location area 3 × 4 km in size.

Awards
 Iron Cross (1939)
 2nd Class (24 July 1942)
 1st Class (2 August 1942)
 Front Flying Clasp of the Luftwaffe in Gold (23 October 1942)
 Honour Goblet of the Luftwaffe on 25 June 1943 as Leutnant and pilot
 German Cross in Gold on 23 December 1942 as Leutnant in the 4./Jagdgeschwader 3
 Knight's Cross of the Iron Cross with Oak Leaves
 Knight's Cross on 1 June 1943 as Leutnant and Staffelführer of the 4./Jagdgeschwader 3 "Udet"
 289th Oak Leaves on 31 August 1943 (posthumously) as Oberleutnant and Staffelkapitän of the 8./Jagdgeschwader 27

Notes

References

Citations

Bibliography

Further reading

 

1921 births
1943 deaths
Military personnel from Hamburg
Luftwaffe pilots
German World War II flying aces
Luftwaffe personnel killed in World War II
Recipients of the Gold German Cross
Recipients of the Knight's Cross of the Iron Cross with Oak Leaves
Aviators killed by being shot down